Title of authority, title of office or title of command is the official designation of a position held in an organization (e.g. in government or corporation) associated with certain duties of authority. 

Semi-formally, the title of office may be referred to as "position", or "office", as, e.g., in the expression "the office of vice president".

When used in conjunction with proper names, titles of office are capitalized (and usually not otherwise): The Right Honourable Stephen Harper, Prime Minister of Canada. In this example both "The Right Honourable" and "Prime Minister" may be called "title of office". The former one is also referred to as "style" (manner of address), the latter one is the designation of a position.

Titles